Charles Henry Whitchurch (29 October 1920 – July 1988) was an English professional footballer who played for Portsmouth, Tottenham Hotspur, Southend United, Folkestone Town and represented England at schoolboy level.

Playing career
Whitchurch began his career with Portsmouth as an amateur. He joined West Ham United in May 1945 and played in 34 wartime matches and scored 11 goals for the Hammers. The winger signed for Tottenham Hotspur in January 1946 and went on to feature in eight senior matches and netted two goals. Whitchurch left White Hart Lane in July 1947 to play for Southend United to notch up a further five goals in 18 appearances. He later had a spell with Folkestone Town in 1948 where he ended his competitive career.

Later life
In July 1988, Whitchurch died in Michigan, United States.

References

1920 births
1988 deaths
People from Grays, Essex
English footballers
English Football League players
Portsmouth F.C. players
West Ham United F.C. players
Tottenham Hotspur F.C. players
Southend United F.C. players
Folkestone F.C. players
Association football wingers